The U.S. Post Office at 220 North Beach Street in Daytona Beach, Florida, United States is a historic building. On June 30, 1988, it was added to the U.S. National Register of Historic Places.

See also 
List of United States post offices

References

External links 
 Volusia County listings at National Register of Historic Places
 Florida's Office of Cultural and Historical Programs
 Volusia County listings
 U.S. Post Office

National Register of Historic Places in Volusia County, Florida
Daytona Beach, Florida
Buildings and structures in Daytona Beach, Florida